was a Japanese samurai from the Sengoku period who served the Imagawa clan. He was the son of Ii Naohira.

Family
 Father: Ii Naohira
 Mother: Ihira Sadanao’s daughter
 Wife: Joshin’in
 Son: Ii Naomori

Life 
Ii Naomune was from Tōtōmi, but became a vassal of Imagawa. He followed his father as the head of the household. He participated in a Mikawa Kuni Tahara Castle attack in 1542 and was killed in action. Ii Naomori of the child inherited a trace.

References 

Samurai
Year of birth unknown
1542 deaths
Ii clan